Clinidium foveolatum is a species of ground beetle in the subfamily Rhysodinae. It was described by Antoine Henri Grouvelle in 1903. It is known from Ecuador.

The holotype, a female, measures  in length.

References

Clinidium
Beetles of South America
Invertebrates of Ecuador
Endemic fauna of Ecuador
Beetles described in 1903